Samuel Johnson Jr. (March 10, 1757 – August 20, 1836) was the author of the first English dictionary compiled by an American, "A school dictionary: being a compendium of the latest and most improved dictionaries". It was printed in New Haven, in 1798, by Edward O'Brien. Martha Jane Gibson, from Yale University, sees Johnson Jr. as America's first lexicographer. He was a schoolteacher, born in the town of Guilford, Connecticut.

Although he was a contemporary of British lexicographer Dr. Samuel Johnson, they were not related in any way. The coincidence of names leads many people to believe that this last one was the author of the dictionary. Rather, Johnson Jr. was from an old Guilford family; his father was a clothier, and his great uncle was the Rev. Dr. Samuel Johnson (1696–1772), noted theologian, and first President of King's College (now Columbia University).  (The New York Times has Johnson Jr. as the son of the theologian, though this seems less likely.)

Also according to the New York Times, "the British Museum has a copy presumably perfect; Yale University Library has the Brinley copy, which lacks pages 157-168 out of 198, the total number. No other copies seem to be known".

References

External links
 

1757 births
1836 deaths
American lexicographers